Daniela Stanciu (born 15 October 1987) is a Romanian athlete who specialises in the high jump. She qualified for the 2016 Summer Olympics. She has qualified to represent Romania again at the 2020 Summer Olympics.

Personal bests

Outdoor

Indoor

Competition record

References

External links 
 
 

1987 births
Living people
Romanian female high jumpers
Athletes (track and field) at the 2016 Summer Olympics
Olympic athletes of Romania
Athletes (track and field) at the 2020 Summer Olympics
20th-century Romanian women
21st-century Romanian women